Caritino Maldonado Pérez (October 5, 1915 – April 17, 1971) was a Mexican politician who served as the Governor of Guerrero from 1969 until 1971. Maldonado died in office in April 1971 and was succeeded by Israel Nogueda Otero.

References

Governors of Guerrero
Institutional Revolutionary Party politicians
Politicians from Guerrero
1915 births
1971 deaths